E. Chandrasekharan Nair (2 December 1928 – 29 November 2017) was an Indian politician, Minister of Kerala and leader of the Communist Party of India.

Biography 

Shri. E. Chandrasekharan Nair, one of the seniormost leaders of CPI and co-operator, was born as the son of Shri. E. Easwara Pillai at Kottarakkara in Kerala on 2 December 1928.

Having entered active politics at a young age, he had joined Students Congress while at Annamalai University, then joined Indian Socialist Party (ISP) and subsequently the Communist Party in 1952. He was a law graduate and practiced as a lawyer till 1970.

A strong advocate of co-operative movement, he had a long association with the co-operative sector, especially in Kollam district. He was the President of Kollam District Co-operative Bank for more than 29 years and had the rare opportunity of getting elected as the Chairman of All India State Co-operative Bank Federation and the Vice-President of National Co-operative Union and member of the Central Committee of the International Co-operative Alliance and member of Agriculture Credit Board of RBI.

Shri. Chandrasekharan Nair became elected to the 1st Kerala Legislative Assembly (KLA) from Kottarakkara constituency, contesting as a Communist Party of India (CPI) candidate. He was elected also to 3rd KLA from Kottarakkara , as CPI candidate. However he resigned his membership on 1 February 1970, to make way for the election of Chief Minister C. Achutha Menon to KLA. He represented Chadayamangalam constituency in the 5th & 6th KLA. In 1987 he won from Pathanapuram.

In the Ministry headed by Shri.E. K. Nayanar, he was the Minister for Food, & Civil Supplies and Housing from 25 January 1980, to 20 October 1981. In addition to the portfolio of Food and Civil Supplies, he handled the portfolio of Animal Husbandry & Dairy Development from 2 April 1987, to 17 June 1991, in the Ministry headed by Shri. E.K. Nayanar. In the 10th KLA he represented Karunagappalli, and was the Minister for Food, Tourism & Law from 20 May 1996, to 13 May 2001. Also he took the initiative to start a Government engineering college in Karunagappalli. As a result  College of Engineering Karunagappally commonly known as CEK, started functioning during the year 1999 under Institute of human resources development for electronics IHRDE (Now IHRD).

In 1980, Shri. Chandrasekharan Nair was appointed Chairman of the Adhoc Committee for the formation of Subject Committees, which recommended the formation of ten Subject Committees for the detailed scrutiny of budget, an innovative concept in the Legislative history of India. The Committee formed under his Chairmanship in 1999 had also given recommendations to streamline the functioning of the Subject Committees, after an in-depth analysis of their working. He had also a remarkable stint as the Chairman of the Committee on Private Member's Bills and Resolutions during 1977–1979.

The concept of "Maveli Stores" aiming at making available essential commodities at fair price to poorer sections of the society, also emerged at his initiative.

He was also the recipient of many honours such as ‘Sadanandan Award’ for best Co-operator and R. Sankara Narayanan Thampi award for best Parliamentarian.

His wife was Smt. Manorama Nair and they have one son and one daughter.

He died at Sri Chitra Hospital in Thiruvananthapuram on 29 November 2017, after a prolonged illness. He was aged 89 at the time of his death.

References

External links
 
 
 

1928 births
2017 deaths
Annamalai University alumni
Kerala MLAs 1957–1959
Kerala MLAs 1967–1970
Kerala MLAs 1977–1979
Communist Party of India politicians from Kerala
People from Kollam district